Roger Barnils Crusats (born 27 May 1994) is a Spanish footballer who plays for Olot as a defensive midfielder.

Club career
Born in Seva, Barcelona, Catalonia, Barnils graduated with local AEC Manlleu's youth setup. He made his debuts as a senior in the 2011–12 campaign, aged only 17, in Tercera División.

On 16 July 2013, Barnils joined Segunda División B's UE Llagostera, achieving promotion to Segunda División (the club's first ever) at the end of the season. On 10 September 2014, he made his debut as a professional, starting in a 0–2 away loss against Real Betis for the campaign's Copa del Rey.

Barnils made his league debut 19 October, coming on as a second-half substitute for Diego Rivas  in a 1–4 home loss against RCD Mallorca. On 19 August 2015, he was loaned to Sevilla Atlético in Segunda División B, for one year.

References

External links

1994 births
Living people
People from Osona
Sportspeople from the Province of Barcelona
Spanish footballers
Footballers from Catalonia
Association football midfielders
Segunda División players
Segunda División B players
Tercera División players
AEC Manlleu footballers
UE Costa Brava players
Sevilla Atlético players
AE Prat players
UE Olot players